Rampage: President Down is a 2016 Canadian action thriller film directed by Uwe Boll.

It is the third film in Boll's Rampage series and a sequel to Rampage (2009) and Rampage: Capital Punishment (2014), also directed by Boll. It is the last film he directed before his retirement in 2016. Four years later, Boll announced a comeback and, via YouTube, a fourth Rampage film that was in development.

Plot
Three years after his second killing spree at a TV station in Washington D.C. (following which he was presumed dead in a massive explosion), Bill Williamson returns from hiding and, using a sniper rifle, assassinates the President of the United States, as well as the Vice President and the Secretary of Defense (which happens off-camera).

While hiding out at his hut in the nearby woods, Bill then taunts the authorities, preparing for a final assault in which he expects to die as a martyr of his own cause, further establishing his iconic legacy. At the climax, Bill takes on and kills dozens more policemen who assault his strongpoint in the woods, but after killing off all of the police, SWAT, and FBI, Bill is fatally wounded and later dies. Some time later, however, news of his death prompts thousands of people all across the US to finally act upon their anger towards the elite and wealthy people, as instructed in Bill's former video statements, resulting in nationwide chaos. It ends with a TV station reporting on all the mass shootings and chaos before the station itself is attacked by the homeless man from the second movie, who approaches the camera and claims that Williamson changed his life before shooting the camera.

Cast
 Brendan Fletcher as Bill Williamson
 Steve Baran as FBI Agent James Molokai
 Ryan McDonell as FBI Agent Vincent Jones
 Scott Patey as FBI Agent Murray
 Crystal Lowe as Bill's Girlfriend
 Loretta Walsh as WK7 News Reporter #1
 Zain Meghji as WK7 News Reporter #2
 Bruce Blain as Homeless Man
 Anthony Rogers as FBI Agent

Production
Boll attempted to crowdfund the film, originally titled Rampage 3: No Mercy, via Indiegogo and Kickstarter. In January 2015, the Indiegogo campaign closed after raising only $6,375 of a requested $100,000. In June 2015, the Kickstarter campaign raised $29,746 of a requested $55,794. Boll posted a series of two profanity-laced videos on YouTube in response, with one of the videos calling crowdfunding "absolutely dead" to him, and another wishing death upon several Hollywood celebrities.

Filming took place in January 2016, in Langley and Maple Ridge, British Columbia, Canada. The film's budget was $750,000.

References

External links

2016 films
2010s English-language films
2016 action thriller films
2016 direct-to-video films
Canadian action thriller films
Canadian direct-to-video films
Canadian sequel films
Direct-to-video action films
Direct-to-video sequel films
Direct-to-video thriller films
English-language Canadian films
Films about mass murder
Films about terrorism in the United States
Films directed by Uwe Boll
Films set in Washington, D.C.
Films shot in British Columbia
Sony Pictures direct-to-video films
2010s Canadian films